Edwin Vernon Westfall (born September 19, 1940) is a Canadian former professional ice hockey player who played 18 seasons in the National Hockey League with the Boston Bruins and the New York Islanders from 1961 until 1978–79.  Notable as a defensive specialist often tasked with defending against the star scorers of opposing teams, Westfall played most of his career as a right wing, although he played stints on defence in his earlier years and at centre in his later years. After his playing career ended, he became a color commentator on Islanders' broadcasts until 1998 when he retired from that position.

Playing career

He played his junior hockey with the Barrie Flyers and Niagara Falls Flyers, and started his professional career with the Kingston Frontenacs. By 1961 he joined the Bruins, although he had stints the next two years with the Frontenacs and the Providence Reds of the American Hockey League (AHL). By 1966, he was firmly ensconced on Boston's checking line.

Westfall won the Stanley Cup with the Boston Bruins in 1970 and 1972. He was on the ice on Bobby Orr's famous Stanley Cup-winning goal in 1970 and also scored the second of the three fastest goals in National Hockey League (NHL) history, when the Bruins scored three goals in 20 seconds in a 1971 game with the Vancouver Canucks. During those seasons he made his reputation as a preeminent penalty killer (generally paired with centre Derek Sanderson or winger Don Marcotte), enough so that he was named to play in the All-Star Game in 1971, 1973, 1974 and 1975.  Westfall scored 18 shorthanded goals for Boston during the regular season and added six more in Stanley Cup play for the Bruins.  The latter mark--which he shares with Sanderson--is still the club record.

Westfall was chosen by the New York Islanders in the 1972 NHL Expansion Draft. He was subsequently made the first captain of the team, a position he held until the 1976–77 season. Westfall scored the first goal in franchise history in their first game against the Atlanta Flames on October 7, 1972. Westfall was the first player to represent the Islanders in the NHL All-Star Game. His best season statistically was 1974–75, when Westfall led the Islanders into their first playoffs and all the way into the Stanley Cup semifinals, exploding in the playoffs with five goals and ten assists to cap a 22-goal, 55-point regular season.

He remained an effective scorer through the 1976–77 season, in which he was awarded the Bill Masterton Trophy for perseverance and dedication, after which he relinquished the team captaincy to Clark Gillies. His scoring declined sharply in his final two seasons, during which he spent his time on checking lines and penalty killing.

Retirement
Westfall retired having played 1226 career NHL games, scoring 231 goals and 394 assists for 625 points.

After the end of his playing days, Westfall became the Islanders' color commentator for what was then known as SportsChannel New York. He was often dubbed "18" by his confidant and broadcasting partner Jiggs McDonald because during his playing career he wore that number. He was also known by that nickname by his former Islander teammates. Westfall continued in that position until he retired in 1998. Former NHL player Joe Micheletti took his spot in the broadcast booth. He made occasional appearances on Islanders' broadcasts for several seasons after that.

Westfall was part of CTV's broadcast team for the 1984 Canada Cup tournament.  He provided reports and did interviews from ice level.

On November 19, 2011, Westfall was inducted into the New York Islanders Hall of Fame. The Islanders held "Ed Westfall Night" in his honor. He and his former partner in the booth "Jiggs" McDonald called the second period in the game that night between two of his former teams, the New York Islanders and the Boston Bruins.

Career statistics

Regular season and playoffs

See also
List of NHL players with 1000 games played

References

External links

1940 births
Living people
Barrie Flyers players
Bill Masterton Memorial Trophy winners
Boston Bruins players
Canadian ice hockey right wingers
Ice hockey people from Ontario
Kingston Frontenacs (EPHL) players
National Hockey League broadcasters
New York Islanders announcers
New York Islanders players
Niagara Falls Flyers players
Stanley Cup champions
Sportspeople from Belleville, Ontario